The Salt Creek Covered Bridge, near Norwich in Perry Township, Muskingum County, Ohio, was built in 1876. It was listed on the National Register of Historic Places in 1974.

See also
List of bridges documented by the Historic American Engineering Record in Ohio

References

External links

Covered bridges in Ohio
Historic American Engineering Record in Ohio
National Register of Historic Places in Muskingum County, Ohio
Bridges completed in 1876